Umut Güneş (born 16 March 2000) is a Turkish professional footballer. He currently plays as a midfielder for Alanyaspor.

Professional career
On 15 August 2019 Güneş signed a professional contract with Alanyaspor on 15 August 2019. Güneş made his professional debut with Alanyaspor in a 5-0 Süper Lig win over MKE Ankaragücü on 30 November 2019.

References

External links

DFB Profile

2000 births
Living people
People from Albstadt
Sportspeople from Tübingen (region)
Citizens of Turkey through descent
Turkish footballers
Turkey youth international footballers
Turkey under-21 international footballers
German footballers
German people of Turkish descent
Alanyaspor footballers
VfB Stuttgart II players
Süper Lig players
Association football midfielders
Footballers from Baden-Württemberg